Sulaimanu (or Suleiman) was an Emir of Kano who reigned from 1807 to 1819.

Biography in the Kano Chronicle
Below is a biography of Sulaimanu from Palmer's 1908 English translation of the Kano Chronicle.

References

Emirs of Kano
19th-century rulers in Africa